Anemosella basalis is a species of snout moth. It is found in Mexico and the US state of Arizona.

References

Moths described in 1914
Chrysauginae
Moths of North America